Kerkaszentkirály is a village in Zala County, Hungary.

The village is part of the Letenye subregion. In the 2001 census, it had a population of 284, with 98.6% of the population identifying themselves as Hungarians.

References

Populated places in Zala County